Gabriela Sabatini was the defending champion, but lost in the semifinals to Martina Navratilova.

Monica Seles won the title by defeating Navratilova 6–1, 6–1 in the final.

Seeds
The first eight seeds received a bye to the second round.

Draw

Finals

Top half

Section 1

Section 2

Bottom half

Section 3

Section 4

References

External links
 Official results archive (ITF)
 Official results archive (WTA)

Italian Open - Womens Singles
1990 Italian Open (tennis)